Four Greats may refer to:

The Four Greats (Norwegian writers), four of the most influential Norwegian writers of the late 19th century
Four greats of Chilean poetry, four of the most important poets of Chilean literature
The four greats of the trova, four of the most influential early singer/songwriters from Cuba